Revelation is  the debut studio album released by American country-pop group Sons of Sylvia. It was released in the United States on April 27, 2010. The first single is "Love Left to Lose," which they performed on American Idol on April 28, 2010. The album's second single "I'll Know You" released to radio on 2010.

Track listing

Charts

References 

Interscope Records albums
2010 debut albums
Sons of Sylvia albums
Albums produced by Ryan Tedder
19 Recordings albums